Leif Mortensen (born 16 August 1940) is a Danish former professional footballer who played throughout Europe as a winger.

Career
Born in Copenhagen, Mortensen began his career with hometown club KB. He spent a year in Italy with Udinese, making five league appearances, before returning to KB. He later spent two seasons in Scotland with Aberdeen, scoring one goal in fifteen league appearances.

Mortensen also made two appearances for the Danish under-21 side in 1961.

References

External links
Post War English & Scottish Football League A - Z Player's Transfer Database

1940 births
Living people
Danish men's footballers
Denmark under-21 international footballers
Kjøbenhavns Boldklub players
Udinese Calcio players
Aberdeen F.C. players
Danish expatriate men's footballers
Expatriate footballers in Italy
Expatriate footballers in Scotland
Serie A players
Scottish Football League players
Association football midfielders
Footballers from Copenhagen